SCO Skunkware, often referred to as simply "Skunkware", is a collection of open-source software projects ported, compiled, and packaged for free redistribution on SCO operating environments. SCO Skunkware packaged components exist for SCO Xenix, SCO UNIX, SCO OpenServer 5, SCO OpenServer 6, UnixWare 2, Caldera OpenLinux, Open UNIX 8, and UnixWare 7. SCO Skunkware was an early pioneering effort to bring open source software into the realm of business computing and, as such, provided an important initial impetus to the acceptance and adoption of open source software in the small and medium business market. An extensive SCO Skunkware download area has been maintained since 1993 and SCO Skunkware components were shipped with operating system distributions as far back as 1983 when Xenix for the IBM XT was released by The Santa Cruz Operation. The annual SCO Forum conference was a venue for the makers and users of SCO Skunkware to meet and discuss its contents and ideas for future additions.

Later additional open source distributions for operating platforms such as the FreeBSD Ports collection and the Solaris Freeware repository would lend additional momentum to the adoption of open source in the business community.

Release history

SCO Skunkware has been released frequently on CD-ROM and as a downloadable CD ISO image. Individual packages are distributed via FTP. The Skunkware CD release history is as follows:

 1983 – First SCO Xenix Games Diskette
 1993 – Skunkware (SCO UNIX 3.2)
 1994 – Skunkware 2.0 (OpenDesktop)
 1995 – Skunkware 5 (OpenServer 5)
 1996 – Skunkware 96 (OpenServer 5)
 1997 – Skunkware 97 (OSR5 + UW2)
 1998 – Skunkware 7 (UnixWare 7)
 1998 – Skunkware 98 (OpenServer 5)
 1999 – Skunkware 7.1 (UnixWare 7)
 1999 – Skunkware 99 (OpenServer 5 and UnixWare 7)
 2000 – Skunkware 2000 (OpenServer 5)
 2000 – Skunkware 7.1.1 (UnixWare 7)
 2001 – Skunkware 8.0.0 (Open UNIX 8)
 2001 – SOSS 3.1 (OpenLinux 3.1)
 2002 – Skunkware 8.0.1 (Open UNIX 8)
 2002 – SOSS 3.1.1 (OpenLinux 3.1.1)
 2006 – Skunkware 2006 (OpenServer 6)

Licensing

SCO Skunkware components are licensed under a variety of terms. Most components are licensed under an OSI approved Open Source license. Many are licensed under the terms of either the GNU General Public License or the GNU Library General Public License.

Licenses used by SCO Skunkware components include or are similar to:

 GNU General Public License
 GNU Library General Public License
 Artistic License
 Mozilla Public License
 Netscape Public License
 The Open Group Public License
 The AST Open Source License
 X Consortium License
 Berkeley Based Licenses

A few of the components are "freeware" with no restrictions on their redistribution. Some components may restrict their use to non-commercial purposes or require a license fee for commercial use (e.g. MBROLA). Some components may be redistributed with special permission from the author(s) as is the case with KISDN.

Packaging formats

SCO Skunkware packages are typically distributed in the native packaging format of the operating system release for which they are intended. Package management systems used by SCO Skunkware include the following:

 Old SCO Custom installable floppy images (SCO Xenix & UNIX 3.2v4)
 New Custom SSO architecture media images (SCO OpenServer 5 and 6)
 SysV pkgadd datastreams (UnixWare 2, UnixWare 7, Open UNIX 8)
 RPM (OpenLinux 3, UnixWare 7, OpenServer 5 & 6)
 Compressed tar and cpio archives (all platforms)

See also
Open-source software
List of free and open-source software packages
The Cathedral and the Bazaar

Notes

References
SCO Skunkware website
SCO Skunkware SCO Forum 1998
Open Source and SCO SCO Forum 2000
Open Source BOF SCO Forum 2002
Open Source Components in SCO OpenServer and SCO UnixWare SCO Forum 2004
Open Source and SCO SCO Forum 2005
Open Source at SCO SCO Forum 2006

SCO, Skunkware, and the Open Source Movement SCO World magazine February 1, 1999
Porting Open Source Software to SCO SCO World magazine November 1, 1999

About SCO World magazine at archive.org

External links
SCO Skunkware FTP download area

Computing platforms
Free software
Free software distributions
Unix software